Bourj El Baroud is a ruined watchtower located somewhat south of the mouth of Oued Ksob near Essaouira, Morocco.  This structure is located on a broad sandy beach directly across from Phoenician ruins at the southeast tip of the main islet of Iles Purpuraires. (Hogan, 2007) This beach is likely the one referred to in Herodotus' account of the Phoenicians' trading with the indigenous peoples of this part of western Morocco.  About one kilometre inland is the village of Diabat.

In popular culture
The locals tell that the ruin inspired the Jimi Hendrix song "Castles Made of Sand" on The Jimi Hendrix Experience album Axis: Bold As Love. In fact, Hendrix only visited Essaouria once, in 1969, two years after that album was made, so the story is presumably false.

The castle was built by Mohammed ben Abdallah in the 18th century, but is mistakenly referred to as "The Portuguese Castle" by local guides. This is a confusion with the Portuguese castle built in 1506 in the Essaouira city harbour by the Portuguese, the Castelo Real.

References
 C.Michael Hogan, Mogador: promontory fort, The Megalithic Portal, ed. Andy Burnham, Nov. 2, 2007 
 Herodotus (circa 425-450 BC) Histories, vol iv, 196

Literature
 TAST, Brigitte; TAST, Hans-Juergen. Still the wind cries Jimi. Hendrix in Marokko, Schellerten, 2012, 

Ancient Morocco
Ruins in Morocco